This is a list of notable figures in the history of pre-territorial Montana, Montana Territory and the state of Montana, including those with significant roles in the exploration and settlement of the region as well as the cultural, economic, military, political, and social development of Montana.

Montana is a state in the Western United States. Added to the U.S. in 1803 and shortly thereafter explored by Lewis and Clark, the territory was home to numerous Native American peoples for millennia. In the mid-19th century the discovery of gold and other valuable minerals led to successive mining booms. Settlement by farmers and ranchers expanded as railroads raced to build networks of tracks linking Montana to Utah to the south, Minneapolis to the east, and Seattle to the west. Montana produced numerous important politicians from both political parties, as well as entrepreneurs who founded cities and built large mining, timber, cattle and other related industries. Individuals have been placed in the period in which they most contributed to Montana history.

Pre-territorial period

 William Clark (explorer), leader of the Lewis and Clark Expedition (1804–1806)
 Meriwether Lewis, leader of the Lewis and Clark Expedition (1804–1806)
 Lieutenant John Mullan, (1830–1909), supervised the building of the first wagon road across the northern Rocky Mountains in 1859–1860 from Fort Benton, Montana to Walla Walla, Washington, the Mullan Road.
 Henry Plummer, (1832–1864) served as sheriff of Bannack, Montana, from May 24, 1863, until January 10, 1864, when he was hanged without trial by the Vigilance Committee of Alder Gulch
 Sacagawea, Indian guide for Lewis and Clark Expedition (1804–1806)
 Father Pierre-Jean De Smet (January 30, 1801 – May 23, 1873), also known as Pieter-Jan De Smet, was a Belgian Roman Catholic priest and member of the Society of Jesus (Jesuits), active in missionary work among the Native Americans of Western Montana in the mid-19th century.

Montana Territory (1864–1889)

The Territory of Montana was an organized incorporated territory of the United States that existed from May 28, 1864, until November 8, 1889, when it was admitted to the Union as the State of Montana. This era was characterized by fighting between the Plains Indians and the U.S. Army, large-scale mining operations, the beginning of substantial agricultural and large cattle ranching operations, and the arrival of the railroads.

 John M. Bozeman, (1835–1867). In 1863, he and John Jacobs blazed the Bozeman Trail, a cutoff route from the Oregon Trail in Wyoming to Bannack, Montana, and guided miners to Virginia City through the Gallatin Valley. In 1864, he laid out the town of Bozeman, Montana.
 Sidney Edgerton (1818–1900) served as Montana Territory's first governor after playing a leading role in its founding. He left Montana in 1865 to petition the Federal government in Washington, D. C. for more support for the fledgling territorial government.

 William Horace Clagett (1838–1901) was Montana Territorial Congressman (1871–1872) and introduced the Act of Dedication bill into Congress that ultimately led to the creation of Yellowstone National Park.
 Lt. Colonel George Armstrong Custer, (1839–1876) was a United States Army officer and cavalry commander in the American Civil War and the Indian Wars. Defeated and killed during the Battle of the Little Bighorn in Southeast Montana. Custer's defeat made him one of the most famous military figures in American history.
 Captain Gustavus Cheyney Doane, (1840–1892) was a U.S. Army Cavalry Captain, explorer, inventor and Civil War soldier who played a prominent role in the exploration of Yellowstone as a member of the Washburn-Langford-Doane Expedition in 1871.
 Nathaniel P. Langford, member of the Washburn–Langford–Doane Expedition to Yellowstone in 1871 and Virginia City, Montana vigilante.
 General Nelson A. Miles (1839–1925) was an American soldier who served in the American Civil War, Indian Wars, and the Spanish–American War. His command was responsible for the capture of Chief Joseph in the Bear Paw Mountains that concluded the Nez Perce War of 1877.
 Thomas C. Power (1839–1923) was a pioneer businessman and politician who lived in Fort Benton from 1867 to 1876 and then in Helena. He built a mercantile empire with T.C. Power and Brothers and served a term as one of Montana's first U.S. senators from 1890 to 1895.
 Wilbur F. Sanders, (1834–1905) frontier lawyer, founding member of the Vigilance Committee of Alder Gulch and first U.S. Senator from the state of Montana.
 Granville Stuart, (1834–1918) was a pioneer, gold prospector, businessman, civic leader, author, cattleman and diplomat who played a prominent role in the early history of Montana Territory and the state of Montana.
 James Stuart, (1832–1873; brother of Granville) was a gold prospector, pioneer, businessman, explorer and Indian agent who played a prominent role in the settlement of Montana Territory.
 Henry D. Washburn, Surveyor General of Montana Territory and leader of the Washburn–Langford–Doane Expedition to Yellowstone in 1871.
 Lester S. Willson, (1839–1919) U.S. Civil War officer and merchant and politician from Bozeman, Montana.

Montana statehood to World War II (1889–1945)
 Evelyn Cameron (1868–1928) was a Terry, Montana based photographer.
 William Andrews Clark, Sr. (1839–1925) was an American politician and entrepreneur, involved with mining, banking and railroads. He is known as one of the three "Copper Kings" of Butte, Montana and was also a U.S. Senator from Montana.
 Marcus Daly, (1841–1900) was an Irish-born American businessman known as one of the three "Copper Kings" of Butte, Montana founder of the town Anaconda, Montana.
 Paris Gibson, (1830–1920), was an entrepreneur and Montana politician who founded Great Falls, Montana.
 George Bird Grinnell (1849–1938) was an anthropologist, historian, naturalist, and writer who was instrumental in the establishment of Glacier National Park.
 James Jerome Hill, (1838–1916), was a Canadian-American railroad executive based in St. Paul, Minnesota. He headed a group of lines especial the Great Northern Railway, which served Montana and a substantial area of the Upper Midwest, the northern Great Plains, and Pacific Northwest. Because of the size of this region and the economic dominance exerted by the Hill lines, Hill became known during his lifetime as The Empire Builder.
 Joseph Kinsey Howard, (1906–1951) was a journalist and historian who wrote about the history, culture, and economic circumstances of Montana and the West.  Howard's landmark 1943 book, Montana:  High, Wide, and Handsome is an animated account of Montana history that has influenced later generations of historians.
 Charles Marion Russell, (1864–1926) was an artist of the Old American West. Russell created more than 2,000 paintings of cowboys, Indians, and landscapes set in Montana in addition to bronze sculptures. Known as 'the cowboy artist', Russell was also a storyteller and author. The C. M. Russell Museum Complex located in Great Falls, Montana houses more than 2,000 Russell artworks, personal objects, and artifacts.
 Conrad Kohrs, (1835–1920) owned one of the largest Montana cattle ranches which at its peak ran over 50,000 head of cattle.
 Harvey Logan (1867–1904), also known as Kid Curry, was a notorious Montana outlaw and gunman who ran with Butch Cassidy and the Sundance Kid's infamous Wild Bunch gang. He killed at least nine law enforcement officers in five different shootings, and another two men in other instances, and was involved in several shootouts with posses and civilians during his outlaw days.

 Jeannette Pickering Rankin, (1880–1973) was the first woman in the U.S. Congress, elected statewide in 1916 and again in 1940. A lifelong pacifist, she voted against the entry of the United States into both World War I and World War II, the only member of Congress to vote against the latter. To date, she is the only woman to be elected to Congress from Montana.
 James Willard Schultz, or Apikuni, (1859–1947) was a noted author, explorer, Glacier National Park guide, and historian of the Blackfoot Indians. Schultz is most noted for his prolific stories about Blackfoot life and his contributions to the naming of prominent features in Glacier National Park.
 John Frank Stevens (1853–1943) was an engineer who built the Great Northern Railway and the first European American to discover the Marias Pass over the Continental Divide in 1889.

Modern Montana (1945–2000)
 George F. Grant, (1906–2008) was an angler, author and conservationist from Butte, Montana. He was active for many years on the Big Hole River. In 1988 Grant established the Big Hole Foundation to focus conservation efforts on the river he had saved through his earlier conservation activities.
 A. B. Guthrie, Jr., (1901–1991) was a novelist, historian, and literary historian who won the Pulitzer Prize for fiction in 1950 for his The Way West dealing with the Oregon Trail and the development of Montana.
 Michael Joseph Mansfield, (1903–2001) was a politician and the longest-serving Majority Leader of the United States Senate, serving from 1961 to 1977. Mansfield represented the state of Montana throughout his political career.
 Lee Metcalf (1911–1978) was a politician from the Democratic Party who represented Montana in the U.S. House of Representatives from 1953 to 1961 and the U.S. Senate from 1961 to 1978. He was a noted supporter of environmental and liberal social legislation during his time in Congress.
 James E. Murray (1876–1961) was a United States Senator, and a leader of the Democratic Party. He served in the United States Senate from 1934 until 1961.
 Kenneth Ross Toole, (1920–1981) was an historian, author, and educator who specialized in the history of Montana.  Perhaps the best-known and most influential of the state's 20th-century historians, Toole served as director of the state's historical society, authored several noted volumes of state history and social commentary, and was a popular professor at the University of Montana for 16 years.    
Robert Craig Knievel, (1938-2007) known as Evel Knievel a daredevil from Butte, Montana. Best known for his jump across the Snake River and Grand Canyon. He suffered many injuries during his career and entertained and inspired many people.

Montana (21st century)
 Max Baucus, (1941–present) is a politician and was the longest serving U.S. Senator from Montana (1978 to 2014). He was the U.S. Ambassador to China.
 Brian Schweitzer, (1955–present) was an international agronomist and soil scientist and served as the 23rd Governor of Montana from 2005 to 2013. Schweitzer became the Chairman of the Stillwater Mining Company in 2013 and is also a political commentator.

See also
Montana in the American Civil War
Territorial evolution of Montana

Notes

 
Montana History
People in history